Valuation: Measuring and Managing the Value of Companies is a textbook on valuation, corporate finance, and investment management by McKinsey & Company. The book was initially published in 1990 and is now available in its sixth edition.

The book has received reviews from The Accounting Review, American Banker, The National Public Accountant, AFP Exchange, and The Journal of Finance.

Further reading

See also
 Investment Valuation
Security Analysis (book)
 Shareholder value

References

External links
 Google books

1990 non-fiction books
American non-fiction books
Finance books
2015 non-fiction books
Wiley (publisher) books